Mercado de abasto is a 1955 Argentine musical comedy film directed by Lucas Demare.

Cast
Tita Merello
Pepe Arias as Lorenzo
Juan José Miguez
Pepita Muñoz
José De Angelis
Luis Otero
Marcelle Marcell as Julian
Joaquín Petrocino
Luis Tasca
Inés Murray
Bertha Moss
Blanca Lagrotta
Alberto Terrones
José Ruzzo

External links
 

1955 films
1950s Spanish-language films
Argentine black-and-white films
1955 musical comedy films
Films shot in Buenos Aires
Films set in Buenos Aires
Argentine musical comedy films
Films directed by Lucas Demare
1950s Argentine films